Lloydricia Cameron (born 8 April 1996) is a Jamaican track and field athlete who competes predominantly in the shot put.

Born in Miami, Florida, to Jamaican parents, Cameron competed for the USA at the 2013 World Youth Championships in Ukraine and the Pan American Junior Championship in Edmonton, Canada in 2015, finishing second in the discus, before choosing to represent the country of her parents. Her mother, Virginia Walcott, had been a track runner for Mount Alvernia in Montego Bay, Jamaica.

Cameron was the 2018 Jamaican Senior Championships gold medalist in the Shot Put, and whilst competing for the University of Florida was the SEC champion at the Indoor Shot Put in 2018, and the Outdoor Shot Put in 2017.

In the shot put at the Pan American Games in Lima, Peru, in 2019 she finished 7th overall.

In July 2021, Cameron was named in the Jamaican Olympic team for the delayed 2020 Summer Games in Tokyo having qualified for the women’s shot put through her world ranking.

References

1996 births
Living people
American female discus throwers
Jamaican female shot putters
Jamaican female discus throwers
Athletes (track and field) at the 2019 Pan American Games
Pan American Games competitors for Jamaica
Athletes (track and field) at the 2020 Summer Olympics
Olympic athletes of Jamaica
21st-century American women
Florida Gators women's track and field athletes